The name Falcon has been used for five tropical Cyclones in the Philippines by PAGASA in the Western Pacific Ocean.

 Tropical Depression Falcon (2003) – a tropical depression that was only recognized by PAGASA.
 Typhoon Nari (2007) (T0711, 12W, Falcon) – struck South Korea.
 Severe Tropical Storm Meari (2011) (T1105, 07W, Falcon) – approached Korea.
 Typhoon Chan-hom (T1509, 09W, Falcon) – powerful and long-lived cyclone, passed between Okinawa and Miyako-jima.
 Tropical Storm Danas (2019) (T1905, 06W, Falcon)

Pacific typhoon set index articles